Tour du Finistère is a single-day road bicycle race held annually in April around the city of Quimper, France. Since 2005, the race is organized as a 1.1 event on the UCI Europe Tour, also being part of the Coupe de France de cyclisme sur route.

Winners

External links
 Information from Cyclingwebsite.net

UCI Europe Tour races
Recurring sporting events established in 1986
1986 establishments in France
Cycle races in France